George Baronzi (1828 in Brăila  – May 28, 1896) was a Romanian poet and translator. He was of Greek origin.

Works

Poetry 
 Nopturne (1853)
 Orele dalbe (1864)
 Satire (1867)
 Legende  şi balade
 Poezii alese, postum (1909)

Other
 Misterele Bucureştului, 3 volume, (1862–1864)
Matei Basarab sau Dorobanţi şi semeni

Note

References
 Petre Pintilie – Brăila, Ed. Tineretului, București, 1966, pag. 153
 Dicţionar Enciclopedic, Ed. Enciclopedică București, 1993, vol I, pag. 180

Romanian poets
Romanian male poets
Romanian translators
People from Brăila
1828 births
1896 deaths
19th-century translators
19th-century poets
19th-century male writers
Romanian people of Greek descent